Paju Bumwoo is a South Korean soccer club based in the city of Paju. It is a lower league club, appearing outside the top two divisions, the K-League and the N-League.

Amateur football clubs in South Korea